The Bachelor: On the Wings of Love is the fourteenth season of ABC reality television series The Bachelor. The season premiere aired on January 4, 2010. The show features 31-year-old Jake Pavelka, a pilot from Dallas, Texas, courting 25 women.

Pavelka finished in seventh place on season 5 of The Bachelorette featuring Jillian Harris. It is the first season of The Bachelor to be broadcast in high definition. The season concluded on March 1, 2010, with Pavelka choosing to propose to 23-year-old marketing rep Vienna Girardi. The couple ended their engagement in June 2010.

Contestants

Biographical information according to ABC official series site, plus footnoted additions

Future appearances

Dancing with the Stars
Pavelka competed in the tenth season of Dancing with the Stars. He partnered with Chelsie Hightower and finished in 7th place.

The Bachelorette
Ali Fedotowsky was chosen as the bachelorette for the sixth season of The Bachelorette.

Bachelor Pad
Runner-up Tenley Molzahn, along with contestants Gia Allemand, Ashley Elmore, Elizabeth Kitt, Michelle Kujawa and Jessie Sulidis, returned for the inaugural season of Bachelor Pad. Kujawa was eliminated during week 1, Sulidis during week 2, Allemand during week 3, and Elmore during week 5.  Kitt and her partner, Jesse Kovacs, were eliminated at the beginning of week 6, finishing in 3rd place.  Molzahn and her partner, Kiptyn Locke, were eliminated at the end of week 6, finishing as the runners-up.

Pavelka, Allemand, Vienna Girardi, and Ella Nolan, returned for the second season of Bachelor Pad. Allemand quit during week 2, and Pavelka was eliminated during week 3.  Nolan and her partner, Kirk DeWindt, were eliminated at the beginning of week 6, finishing in 4th place. Girardi and her partner, Kasey Kahl, were eliminated at the end of week 6, finishing in 3rd place.

Bachelor in Paradise
Kujawa returned for the first season of Bachelor in Paradise. She quit during week 1. Molzahn returned for the second season of Paradise. She broke up with Joshua Albers in week 6.

Other appearances
Outside of the Bachelor Nation franchise, Molzahn and Kujawa appeared as contestants in the Bachelors vs. Bachelorettes special on the season 7 of Wipeout.

Call-out order

 The contestant received the first impression rose
 The contestant received a rose during the date
 The contestant was eliminated
 The contestant was eliminated during the date
 The contestant quit the competition
 The contestant received a rose during the date but disqualified from the competition
 The contestant moved on to the next week by default
 The previously eliminated contestant asked for a chance to return the competition but denied
 The contestant won the competition

Episodes

Post-show

After the Final Rose
This is the special episode which airs after every finale. In season 14's segment, Jake told Chris Harrison about Bachelor Pad, Ali was chosen as the next bachelorette in the sixth season of The Bachelorette. Jake and Vienna  were seen in a public appearance as a couple, Jeffrey Osborne sang "On the Wings of Love" at the closing of the show.

In June 2010,  several months after their engagement, it was announced that Jake and Vienna Girardi had split.

Deaths

Gia Allemand
On August 14, 2013, third-place contestant Gia Allemand died after a reported suicide attempt. Several contestants as well as Pavelka expressed their condolences via Twitter, with Pavelka saying, "I am in complete shock and devastated to hear the news about Gia. She was one of the sweetest people I have ever known. And a very dear friend. My heart goes out to her family during this very difficult time. We have lost an angel today. I miss you Gia...".

Alexa McAllister

On 16 February 2016, Alexa (Lex) McAllister died after an apparent suicide attempt in Columbus, Ohio, as reported by TMZ. Per E!News, the local police said that on 13 February they'd received a call in which it was claimed that McAllister had overdosed on prescription drugs. While McAllister was in a stable condition on her way to Grant Medical Center, then E!News got access to a police report, which stated that she had taken "a lot" of pills. Her family took her off life support after her health began to deteriorate. McAllister was 31. Pavelka tweeted his condolences on Twitter, "I'm so sad to hear about Alexa. Such a beautiful girl. My heart breaks for her family. Covering them in prayer during this rough time".

Jake Pavelka

Jake Pavelka grew up in Denton, Texas, and attended University of North Texas and Embry-Riddle Aeronautical University. In his free time, he takes dancing lessons, woodworking, and has fun flying acrobatic planes and he is also a former child actor. Pavelka is an airline pilot, and took his first flying lessons at 12 years old. He also became a certified flight instructor when he was 23 years old.

Pavelka became a member of an ABC reality show for the third time when he appeared as a celebrity contestant on the tenth season of Dancing with the Stars, partnered with Chelsie Hightower he was the fifth competitor eliminated on April 27, 2010.

Notes

References

External links
 

The Bachelor (American TV series) seasons
2010 American television seasons
Television shows filmed in California
Television shows filmed in New York City
Television shows filmed in Massachusetts
Television shows filmed in Oregon
Television shows filmed in Florida
Television shows filmed in Saint Lucia